The 2007 Cross River State gubernatorial election was the 6th gubernatorial election of Cross River State. Held on April 14, 2007, the People's Democratic Party nominee Liyel Imoke won the election, defeating Eyo Etim Nyong of the Democratic People's Party.

Results 
Liyel Imoke from the People's Democratic Party won the election, defeating Eyo Etim Nyong from the Democratic People's Party. Registered voters was 1,139,736.

References 

Cross River State gubernatorial elections
Cross River gubernatorial